EUCARIS (short for European Car and Driving License Information System) is an information exchange system that provides an infrastructure and software to countries to share, among others, their car-  and driving licence-registration information, helping  fight car theft and registration-fraud. EUCARIS is developed by and for governmental authorities and is able to support all kinds of transport related information exchange based on treaties, directives, bi- and multilateral agreements.

History 
In the early nineties five European vehicle and driving licence registration authorities (BE, DE, UK, LU and NL) took the initiative to set up a network for data communication and to give European countries the opportunity to share vehicle and driver registration information.

The system is operational since 1994 and used Tuxedo as main technology for the exchange. In 2007 this system was replaced by the second generation of EUCARIS (a.k.a. EUCARIS II) which uses open standards (XML/Webservice/SOAP). The current EUCARIS software is built using the Microsoft .NET platform.

Supporting treaties or agreements 
EUCARIS currently supports the following treaties, council decisions, and bi- or multilateral agreements:

EUCARIS is a multilateral treaty that provides opportunities to countries to share their car and driving licence registration information, helping to fight car theft and registration fraud.

Prüm 
The Prüm treaty, also partly adapted by Council Decision 2008/615/JHA and 2008/616/JHA. The treaty and Council Decisions supports cross-border cooperation, particularly in combating terrorism and cross-border crime.

Bilateral information exchange 
Exchange of vehicle and its owner/holder date for the enforcement of traffic violations, toll collection, etc.

eCall 
eCall is a project intended to bring rapid assistance to motorists involved in a collision anywhere in the European Union. Member states participating in eCall may use the EUCARIS platform for exchanging messages.

RESPER 
RESPER (Réseau permis de conduire/Drivers License Network) is a network to be established across the European Union which should be fully operational by 19/1/2013. EUCARIS will be able to connect to the RESPER network giving the Member States a choice whether they want to use EUCARIS to exchange driving licence information via RESPER.

ERRU 
ERRU (European Register of Road Transport Undertakings) allows competent authorities to better monitor the compliance of road transport undertakings across the European Union which should be fully operational by 1/1/2013. EUCARIS will be able to connect to the ERRU network giving the Member States a choice whether they want to use EUCARIS to exchange information via ERRU.

Participating member states 
The table below shows the currently participating member states who are actively exchanging data:

References

External links 
 Eucaris.net

Motor vehicle theft
Government databases of the European Union
Information systems
Information technology organizations based in Europe